is a children's anime series by Fujiko Fujio.

Created by the same team of Doraemon and clearly influenced by it, it tells the adventures of a Tarzanesque child and his friends in modern Tokyo. It consists of 61 episodes and was originally broadcast on TV Asahi. The show is most famous for having character designs by famous anime director Hayao Miyazaki of Spirited Away and My Neighbor Totoro

Cast  
 Kaneta Kimotsuki  as Kurobe
 Kazuko Sugiyama  as Shishio Sarari
 Eiko Masuyama  as Toriko Sarari
 Hiroshi Ohtake  as Sensei
 Junko Hori  as Okara

  Keisuke Yamashita   as Tiger
 Kouji Yada  as Mitsuru Sarari 
  Masako Ebisu  as Takane Fujino
 Reiko Katsura  as Aka-bee
 Tetsuo Mizutori  as Pao Pao
  Yoshiko Yamamoto   as Gakku

References

External links
 

1973 anime television series debuts
1973 Japanese television series endings
Japanese children's animated adventure television series
Japanese children's animated comedy television series
Adventure anime and manga
Comedy anime and manga
Jungle men
TMS Entertainment
TV Asahi original programming